J.B. Adams (born September 29, 1954) is an American character stage and film actor, director, and singer. He has credits in film, television and, most notably, musical theatre. Originally from Oklahoma City, Oklahoma, he attended Oklahoma City University, where he studied voice, piano, opera, and musical theatre, after which he became a New York City-based Broadway actor. He is perhaps best known for his roles in the Broadway productions of Beauty and the Beast (as Maurice, the father), Annie (as Rooster/Drake/Bert Healy/FDR), Parade (as Luther Rosser), Me and My Girl (as Sir Jasper),  Chitty Chitty Bang Bang (as Grandpa Potts), and Elf: The Musical (as Santa). He played the role of Morris Farnsworth in the film Far From Heaven, as well as originating the same role in the Off-Broadway musical adaptation (2013). On TV and the web, he has played Santa for Verizon FiOS and has had guest starring roles on Law & Order: Special Victims Unit and The Michael J. Fox Show.

Filmography

Film

Television

Broadway
 Parade as Luther Rosser
 Beauty and the Beast as Maurice
 Chitty Chitty Bang Bang as Grandpa Potts
 Annie as Drake/Bert Healy
 Me and My Girl as Sir Jasper
Elf: The Musical as Santa

Off-Broadway
Far from Heaven as Dr. Bowman
Balancing Act

External links

Broadway World J.B. profile

1954 births
Living people
American male film actors
American male stage actors
American male television actors
20th-century American male actors
21st-century American male actors